"Rush Hour" is a song by American musician Jane Wiedlin, taken from her second album, Fur (1988). It was backed by the album track "End of Love". The UK 12-inch single of "Rush Hour" includes an extended remix by Rusty Garner and an instrumental version.

"Rush Hour" is Wiedlin's most successful single, reaching number nine on the US Billboard Hot 100, number 12 on the UK Singles Chart, and number eight in Ireland. The music video for the single eschews the traffic metaphor of the song for a lighter concept: a simple "performance" clip interspersed with footage of Wiedlin swimming with dolphins.

Track listings
7-inch, cassette, and mini-CD single
A. "Rush Hour" – 4:03
B. "The End of Love" – 3:17

Canadian and Australasian 12-inch single
A1. "Rush Hour" (extended remix) – 7:20
A2. "Rush Hour" (7-inch version) – 4:02
B1. "Rush Hour" (The Red mix) – 7:23
B2. "Rush Hour" (instrumental) – 5:03
B3. "The End of Love" – 3:17

UK 12-inch single
A1. "Rush Hour" (extended remix) – 7:20
A2. "Rush Hour" (7-inch version) – 4:02
B1. "Rush Hour" (instrumental) – 5:03
B2. "The End of Love" – 3:17

UK CD single
 "Rush Hour" – 4:03
 "The End of Love" – 3:14
 "Rush Hour" (The Red mix) – 7:26

Charts

Notable cover versions
 Northern Ireland band Joyrider had a UK No. 22 hit with their version of the song in 1996.
 In 2007, an updated remix by SJB (A.K.A  James Hockley and Ed Lucas) which features original vocals by Wiedlin was a promotional only release in the UK.

References

Jane Wiedlin songs
1988 singles
1988 songs
EMI Records singles
Manhattan Records singles
Song recordings produced by Stephen Hague
Songs written by Jane Wiedlin